Ursula King is a Paralympic swimmer from Australia. She was a classified "3" competitor at the 1984 New York Stoke/Mandeville Paralympics representing Australia in freestyle and butterfly events. She won silver in the 50m freestyle, and two bronzes in the 200 m freestyle and 25 m butterfly.

References

Female Paralympic swimmers of Australia
Swimmers at the 1984 Summer Paralympics
Paralympic silver medalists for Australia
Paralympic bronze medalists for Australia
Living people
Year of birth missing (living people)
Medalists at the 1984 Summer Paralympics
Paralympic medalists in swimming
Australian female freestyle swimmers
Australian female butterfly swimmers
20th-century Australian women